The American rock band Fall Out Boy has released seven studio albums, two  live albums, two compilation albums, eight extended plays, 32 singles, and 47 music videos. Since their formation in 2001, Fall Out Boy have sold over 8.5 million albums worldwide and some estimates are around 30 million. The band was formed in Wilmette, Illinois by friends Joe Trohman and Pete Wentz, who had played in local Chicago hardcore punk and heavy metal bands; Patrick Stump was soon recruited as the band's lead singer. They debuted with the split EP Project Rocket / Fall Out Boy (2002) and the mini-LP Fall Out Boy's Evening Out with Your Girlfriend (2003), both released on Uprising Records. After the release of the latter, drummer Andy Hurley joined Fall Out Boy and Stump picked up guitar, forming the band's current lineup. After signing to indie-label Fueled by Ramen, Fall Out Boy released their first full-length studio album, Take This to Your Grave, in May 2003. Following the album's release, the band signed with major label Island Records. Their second studio album From Under the Cork Tree was released in May 2005 to great commercial success, peaking at number nine on the United States Billboard 200 and being certified double platinum by the Recording Industry Association of America (RIAA). The album's popularity was aided by the success of its first two singles, "Sugar, We're Goin Down" and "Dance, Dance", which both became top ten hits on the US Billboard Hot 100 and eventually sold over two million downloads each.

Fall Out Boy's third studio album Infinity on High was released in February 2007, debuting at number one on the Billboard 200 with 260,000 first week sales and being certified platinum by the RIAA. "This Ain't a Scene, It's an Arms Race", the album's lead single, peaked at number two on the Billboard Hot 100 and also hit the top ten in countries such as Canada, New Zealand and the United Kingdom. The second single commissioned, "Thnks fr th Mmrs", peaked at number eleven on the Hot 100 and sold 3 million downloads. Infinity on High also produced the singles ""The Take Over, the Breaks Over"" and "I'm Like a Lawyer with the Way I'm Always Trying to Get You Off (Me & You)". The band released their fourth studio album Folie à Deux in December 2008; it debuted at number eight on the Billboard 200 with 149,000 first week sales and was certified gold by the RIAA. Four singles were released from Folie à Deux – the most successful of these was the platinum-certified "I Don't Care", which peaked at number 21 on the Hot 100.

Fall Out Boy released the compilation album Believers Never Die – Greatest Hits in November 2009. Following the album's release, the band announced that they would be going on an indefinite hiatus. The group announced the end of their hiatus four years later, releasing the single "My Songs Know What You Did in the Dark (Light Em Up)"; it peaked at number thirteen on the Billboard Hot 100 and went six-times platinum. Their fifth studio album Save Rock and Roll was released on April 16, 2013. It debuted at number one on the Billboard 200 with 154,000 first week sales. PAX AM Days, a punk and hardcore-influenced EP, followed later in the year on October 15. "Centuries" was released as the sixth album's lead single in September 2014, peaking on the Hot 100 at number 10 and being certified four-times platinum. Sixth album American Beauty/American Psycho, released in January 2015, became the band's third Billboard 200 number one, with 192,000 first week sales. On January 19, 2018, their seventh studio album, Mania, was released and became their third Billboard 200 number one in a row and their fourth overall. Their newest album So Much (For) Stardust releases March 24, 2023.

Albums

Studio albums

Live albums

Compilation albums

Remix albums

Mixtapes

Extended plays

Singles

As lead artist

As featured artist

Other charted songs

Other appearances

Music videos

Notes

References

Music: Rock - Unexpected Fall Out, Boy
Teitelman, Bram. Billboard: The International Newsweekly of Music, Video and Home Entertainment 117.22  (May 28, 2005): 31.

External links
 Official website
 Fall Out Boy at AllMusic
 
 

Discographies of American artists
Rock music group discographies
Pop punk group discographies